Kurt Schneider (1 September 1932 – 21 January 2023) was an Austrian racing cyclist. He rode in the 1954 Tour de France.

References

1932 births
2023 deaths
Austrian male cyclists
Cyclists from Vienna